Stay Together may refer to:

 "Stay Together" (Suede song), 1994
 "Stay Together" (Barbara Tucker song), 1995
 "Stay Together" (Mandaryna song), 2006
 "Stay Together" (Noah Cyrus song), 2017
 "Stay Together", a song by N.E.R.D. from In Search of...
"Stay Together", a song by 2NE1 from 2NE1
 Stay Together (album), a 2016 album by Kaiser Chiefs

See also 
 Let's Stay Together (disambiguation)